Theodoxus niloticus is a species of freshwater snail with a gill and an operculum. It is an aquatic gastropod mollusk in the family Neritidae, the nerites.

Distribution 
Distribution of this species include Egypt and Sudan.

The type locality is the Nile in Egypt.

Description
The length of the shell is 8 mm.

There are two apophyses on its operculum.

Ecology
It lives in slow running waters.

References

External links

Neritidae
Gastropods described in 1856